Fejervarya pulla is a species of frog in the family Dicroglossidae. It is endemic to Malaysia and only known from its type locality, Penang Hill. LIttle is known about this species that might even belong to Hoplobatrachus instead of Fejervarya.

References

External links
Amphibian and Reptiles of Peninsular Malaysia - Fejervarya pulla

Fejervarya
Amphibians of Malaysia
Endemic fauna of Malaysia
Taxonomy articles created by Polbot
Amphibians described in 1870